Truxton King is a lost 1923 American silent drama film directed by Jerome Storm. The film stars John Gilbert while he was a player for Fox Film Corporation and is based upon the novel Graustark by George Barr McCutcheon.

Plot
As described in a film magazine, looking for adventure, American Truxton King (Gilbert) is visiting the eastern European country of Graustark. He accidentally enters the palace grounds and meets Prince Robin (Moore), who takes a liking to the stranger and shows him around. They meet his Aunt Lorraine (Clifford) who went to school with Truxton's sister. Prince Robin makes the American promise that he will meet him at the fortune teller's hut the next day. Truxton goes there and overhears a plot to assassinate the young heir. Truxton is made a prisoner but later escapes, also freeing Lorraine who was also captured. He returns in time to prevent the attempted assassination. The revolutionist then attacks the castle and Truxton goes for help. They arrive in time to save the Prince. Truxton realizes his love for Lorraine although, because of their different stations in society, he prepares to leave. Lorraine then tells him that she is an American, too, and consents to be his wife.

Cast
John Gilbert as Truxton King
Ruth Clifford as Lorraine
Frank Leigh as Count Marlaux
Michael D. Moore as Prince Robin
Otis Harlan as Hobbs
Henry Miller, Jr. as Count Carlos Von Enge
Richard Wayne as John Tullis
Willis Marks as William Spanz
Winifred Bryson as Olga Platanova
Mark Fenton as Baron Dangloss

References

External links

Lobby card

1923 films
Lost American films
Fox Film films
Films based on American novels
Films set in Europe
American silent feature films
1923 drama films
American black-and-white films
Silent American drama films
1923 lost films
Lost drama films
Films directed by Jerome Storm
1920s American films